The 35th Federal Congress of the Spanish Socialist Workers' Party was held in Madrid from 21 to 23 July 2000 to renovate the governing bodies of the Spanish Socialist Workers' Party (PSOE) and establish the party's main lines of action and strategy for the next leadership term. It was held after the party's defeat in the 2000 general election and the subsequent resignation of then secretary-general Joaquín Almunia.

Under a plurality voting system, José Luis Rodríguez Zapatero unexpectedly won the party leadership with 41.6% of the delegate vote (414 votes), to president of Castilla–La Mancha and initial favourite José Bono's 40.7% (405 votes). Former social affairs minister Matilde Fernández secured 11.0% (109 votes), whereas the leader of the PSOE group in the European Parliament, Rosa Díez, obtained 6.5% (65 votes). Zapatero would subsequently win the 2004 Spanish general election and become prime minister of Spain in April 2004, a post he would held until 2011.

Timetable
The key dates are listed below (all times are CET):

22 March: Official announcement of the congress.
13–15 June: Election of congress delegates.
21–23 July: Federal congress.

Candidates

Declined
The individuals in this section were the subject of speculation about their possible candidacy, but publicly denied or recanted interest in running:

Cristina Alberdi (age ) — President of the FSM–PSOE (since 1997); Deputy in the Cortes Generales for Málaga and Madrid (since 1996); Minister of Social Affairs of Spain (1993–1996).
Joaquín Almunia (age ) — Deputy in the Cortes Generales for Madrid (since 1979); Leader of the Opposition of Spain (1997–1998 and 1999–2000); Secretary-General of the PSOE (1997–2000); Spokesperson of the PSOE Group in the Congress of Deputies (1994–1997); Minister of Public Administrations (1986–1991); Minister of Labour and Social Security (1982–1986).
Josep Borrell (age ) — Deputy in the Cortes Generales for Barcelona (since 1986); Leader of the Opposition of Spain (1998–1999); Spokesperson of the PSOE Group in the Congress of Deputies (1998–1999); Minister of Public Works, Transport and Environment of Spain (1993–1996); Minister of Public Works and Urbanism of Spain (1991–1993); Secretary of State of Finance of Spain (1984–1991); Secretary-General of Budget and Public Expenditure of Spain (1982–1984); City Councillor of Majadahonda (1979–1983).
Felipe González (age ) — Deputy in the Cortes Generales for Madrid and Seville (since 1977); Secretary-General of the PSOE (1974–1979 and 1979–1997); Prime Minister of Spain (1982–1996); President pro tempore of the Council of the European Union (1989 and 1995); Spokesperson of the PSOE Group in the Congress of Deputies (1977–1979).

Endorsements
Candidates seeking to run were required to collect the endorsements of at least 10% of congress delegates.

Results

References

2000 conferences
2000 in Spain
Political party leadership elections in Spain
PSOE Congresses
PSOE leadership election